Paul Kiesow Petzoldt (January 16, 1908 – October 6, 1999) was an American mountaineer and wilderness educator known for establishing the National Outdoor Leadership School in 1965.

Early life and education 
Petzoldt was born in Creston, Iowa. The youngest of nine children, he was raised on a farm in southern Idaho. From 1929 to 1932, Petzoldt attended the University of Idaho, the University of Wyoming, and the University of Utah but did not earn a degree.

Career 
He made his first ascent of the Grand Teton in 1924 at the age of 16. He had a hand in creating the first guide service in the Tetons. In 1938 he was a member of the first American team to attempt a climb on K2. For the climb he did not use assisted oxygen; he learned to use rhythmic breathing. He and Dan Bryant, from New Zealand, were the first climbers ever to traverse the Matterhorn twice in one day.

During World War II Petzoldt served in the U.S. Army's 10th Mountain Division, fighting on the Italian Front.

Petzoldt's other accomplishments in the outdoors are also considered major advances among wilderness enthusiasts. 

From 1963 to 1965, Petzoldt was the chief instructor for Outward Bound Colorado prior to establishing NOLS, the National Outdoor Leadership School.  Noted in his introduction to The New Wilderness Handbook, his experience in NOLS, Outward Bound, and love of the wilderness evolved into the Wilderness Education Association. WEA courses, certification and knowledge are still helping many advocates of the environment learn to have low-impact adventures in the environment.
Among the early instructors in Petzoldt's Outward Bound programs was Vince Lee.

See also
Ramshorn Dude Ranch Lodge: a National Register of Historic Places property associated with Petzoldt

References

Petzoldt, Paul, Raye Carlson Ringholz. The New Wilderness Handbook. WW Norton & Company. New York: 1975.
Petzoldt, Paul K. Teton Tales and Other Petzoldt Anecdotes. ICS Books, Inc. Merrillville, Indiana: 1995.

External links
National Outdoor Leadership School
Wilderness Education Association
Paul Petzoldt: brief biography and quotes

1908 births
1999 deaths
American mountain climbers
Outdoor educators